Peter Alberti may refer to:

Peter Adler Alberti (1851–1932), Danish politician and swindler
Peter Caesar Alberti (1608–1655), regarded as the first Italian American settler in what is now New York State